Four (stylised as FOUR; formerly TV4) was the second New Zealand television channel owned and operated by MediaWorks New Zealand, broadcast via the state-owned Kordia transmission network. The channel launched on 29 June 1997 as TV4 and was replaced by C4 on 3 October 2003. It was relaunched on 6 February 2011 as a separate channel from C4.

On 2 July 2016, Mediaworks closed Four and replaced it with Bravo as part of a deal with NBC Universal.

In general, the channel's target audience was 18- to 49-year-olds and could be broader in its appeal, with programming which attracted a wider, and more mature audience. During early mornings and late afternoons the channel screened a range of children's programming such as Sesame Street and in the evenings screened shows aimed at the mainstream audience. Overnight and late mornings – early afternoons the channel screened Infomercials and Auto TV (Car Commercials). Four broadcast mostly American programming, with the exception of Sticky TV, Four Live, and Smash, which were in-house produced Auckland-hosted youth shows, and the Pukana youth show, which was produced from a Maori language government fund. Pukana also airs on one of the two government funded Maori language channels.

History

The history of Four dates back to 1997 when TV3 decided to launch a second TV channel called TV4. TV4 was an entertainment network and screened a wide range of imported shows such as South Park, Beverly Hills 90210, Beavis and Butthead. After 2000, new programming was scarce, with the infiltration of 1980's and 1990's repeats. On October 3, 2003, TV4 was replaced by music channel C4.

On 6 February 2011, TV4 returned as Four. MediaWorks announced this in October 2010, and said that the new network would focus on children's programming during the day and in the evenings will screen a range of shows aimed at the 18- to 49-year-old audience. The first programme to air on Four was The Simpsons episode "Elementary School Musical" (not coincidentally featuring New Zealand band Flight of the Conchords).

At the end of 2012, Four began screening some new episodes of shows within seven days of the show being broadcasting in the United States under the Fast Four brand. Examples of shows include The Simpsons, Family Guy, Glee and How I Met Your Mother. New Zealand TV networks typically start screening most US television series around five months after the original release, usually first screening in late January or February at the end of the New Zealand summer, catching up to the US at the end of the season as all 22 episodes are broadcast week-after-week, not spread out over nine months as in the US. The transition of shows like Glee from TV3 to Four also lost the NZ On Air funding that is given to TV3 to get EIA-608 captions converted from source masters to the preferred Teletext format by TVNZ's Access Services. As New Zealand broadcasters are completely reliant on this process for program subtitling.

Closure
The final ever show to air on FOUR was The Biggest Loser. At 10:50 pm on Saturday 2 July 2016, the channel closed with Feist singing "1234" (the same Sesame Street song that was used to relaunch the channel back in February 2011); the channel then faded to black.

Four Plus 1

Four Plus 1 was a timeshift service that MediaWorks launched on 27 June 2014. It was a standard hour-delayed timeshift channel of the Four broadcast. Four Plus 1 was initially only available on digital terrestrial with satellite launched a week later on Sky's fifth digital transport. It was replaced by Bravo Plus 1 on 3 July 2016, when Bravo replaced Four.

References

External links
Four's official website (archived)

Defunct television channels in New Zealand
Television channels and stations established in 2011
Television channels and stations disestablished in 2016
English-language television stations in New Zealand
2011 establishments in New Zealand
2016 disestablishments in New Zealand